The Massacre of Kommeno was a Nazi war crime perpetrated by members of the Wehrmacht in the village of Kommeno, Greece, in 1943, during the German occupation of Greece in World War II.

Background

Geography
Kommeno is a village in western Greece near Arta. It is located on the east bank of the Arachthos river, north of the Gulf of Ambracia. According to the 1940 census, it had 776 inhabitants engaged in agriculture and fishing.

1943 in Kommeno
By the summer of 1943, Greek partisan organizations such as ELAS and EDES had assembled strong armed bands which frequently attacked the Axis occupation forces. As the partisans relied upon civilians for food and intelligence, the Wehrmacht applied collective responsibility to entire communities and systematically used mass reprisals to intimidate the population. The massacre of Kommeno is a typical example of this policy.

On 12 August 1943 a small food requisitioning detachment of partisans reached Kommeno. While collecting food, a two-man Wehrmacht reconnaissance team drove into the village and upon seeing the partisans, made a U-turn and drove away. Fearing reprisals, the locals spent the night in the fields and sent a delegation to the Italian commander in Arta to explain the situation. Being reassured that there wouldn't be any consequences, they returned to their homes and prepared to celebrate the Assumption on the 15th.
On the evening of 15 August, a marriage had taken place in Kommeno and many people from the village and the surrounding area stayed up late celebrating.

The massacre
 
At dawn on 16 August, 120 men of the 12th Company of the 98th Regiment of the 1st Mountain Division under the command of Leutnant Willibald Röser drove to Kommeno on lorries. On the previous night, the regiment commander Oberst  had given them a short, fierce speech alleging that they were going to wipe out a partisan nest and ordering them to spare no one. Most of the men had been fighting in the Eastern Front and they were accustomed to carrying out similar reprisals against the local population.

The soldiers surrounded the village from three directions, leaving unattended only the access to the Arachthos river. Houses were first attacked with grenades and as villagers awoke and tried to flee, they were indiscriminately shot at. Many women, children and elderly fell victims.

Among the first casualties was the village priest, who was killed by Röser as he begged him to spare his church fold. Several eyewitness reports described women being raped, people beaten and corpses humiliated. Around forty of the marriage guests that were still awake celebrating were also murdered.

The only escape route lay across the river and many villagers managed to cross it, either swimming or onboard small boats. After seizing livestock and looting valuables, the Germans set the village ablaze.

Aftermath

The official list of casualties includes 317 victims, among which 73 children aged under ten, 20 entire families and the newlyweds. A monument commemorating the massacre has been erected in the main square.

The official Wehrmacht reports about the events in Kommeno falsely claimed that the village was in partisan hands who opened heavy fire against the Germans. It also claimed that 150 "partisans" were killed as a result.

Salminger was killed in an ambush by partisans on 1 October 1943. In reprisal, German forces of the 1st Mountain Division perpetrated the Lyngiades massacre on 3 October 1943.
Röser was killed in November 1944 in Freiburg during an airstrike.

The divisional commander, Generalleutnant Walter Stettner went missing after mid-October 1944 near Belgrade, and was never brought to justice for the atrocities in Kommeno.

No reparations were paid to the families of the victims.

See also
Lyngiades massacre
Massacre of Kalavryta
Distomo massacre
Viannos massacres
Holocaust of Kedros
List of massacres in Greece
War crimes of the Wehrmacht

External links 
H.F. Meyer - Kommeno. A narrative reconstruction of a war crime committed by the Wehrmacht in Greece
 Digital archive of the Greek Radio & Television (ΕΡΤ & ET1)
 The Holocaust of the Kommeno village of Arta.
 The Holocaust of Kommeno Artas, 16.8.1943, Part I.
 The Holocaust of Kommeno Artas, 16.8.1943, Part II.

References

Nazi war crimes in Greece
1943 in Greece
Massacres in Greece during World War II
Epirus in World War II
August 1943 events
War crimes of the Wehrmacht
Massacres in 1943
1943 murders in Europe